The Orienting Labour Party (Portuguese: Partido Orientador Trabalhista, POT) was a political party in Brazil. It supported Cristiano Machado to the Presidency of Brazil in 1950 General Elections. Due to unimpressive results, its registration was revoked by the Superior Electoral Court in 1951.

Electoral history

Presidential elections

Chamber of Deputies and Senate elections

References 

Political history of Brazil
Defunct political parties in Brazil
Political parties established in 1945
Political parties disestablished in 1951
1945 establishments in Brazil
1951 disestablishments in Brazil